Blue Bell Hill is a village in the Aylesford parish of the borough of Tonbridge and Malling in Kent, England. It is located halfway between Chatham and Maidstone and lies on top of Blue Bell Hill. The community significantly expanded with the developments of the Walderslade area in the post war years, creating several housing estates around the village.

Amenities 
The village features a recently built (2007) Dental Surgery, large commuter car park (for coach commuting to London), a church (in the parish of Holy Trinity South Chatham), a BT telephone exchange. There used to be a pub (the Upper Bell) and shop in the village but both have closed, the Robin Hood pub lies outside the village along Common Road, and the Lower Bell pub is nearby. Medway crematorium lies to the east (along Robin Hood Lane Upper), alongside the M2. Buckmore Park Scout Centre used to lie to the northwest, but after significant redevelopment in light of the construction of High Speed 1 and M2 widening, led to financial problems resulting in its closure. However Buckmore Park Kart Circuit continues to operate as a separate centre.

Transport 
The village is located to the south of the intersection (junction 3) of the M2 and A229 and is bypassed by the A229. The A229 traces the route of a Roman road between Chatham and Maidstone, and its old route up the hill still exists (Warren Road).

There are extensive regular bus services between the Medway Towns and Maidstone by Arriva, historically Maidstone & District (the 101 and 150 routes) as well as local Bus 142 into Medway There are also numerous commuter coaches travelling into London.

Local government 
Blue Bell Hill and parts of southern Walderslade are located in the Aylesford parish of Tonbridge and Malling. The rest of Walderslade is in the borough of Medway.

See also
Buckmore Park Kart Circuit

External links

Villages in Kent